Vile Creature are a Canadian heavy metal band from Hamilton, Ontario. They are most noted for their 2020 album Glory, Glory! Apathy Took Helm!, which received a Juno Award nomination for Heavy Metal Album of the Year at the Juno Awards of 2021.

The band consists of guitarist and vocalist KW and drummer and vocalist Vic, a couple who both identify as queer and make music from a progressive activist perspective. In addition to their musical career, they operate the Coven Plant Based Marketplace, a vegan food store in Hamilton, and KW is part owner of a tattoo shop, Sleepy Bones.

The duo released their first album, A Steady Descent Into the Soil, in 2015, and followed up with the EP A Pessimistic Doomsayer in 2017 and the album Cast of Static and Smoke in 2018. In 2019, after signing to Prosthetic Records, they released Preservation Rituals (2015-2018), a compilation album which combined all three of the earlier releases.

Personnel
Members
 Vic – drums, vocals 
 KW – guitar, vocals, drums

Discography
Studio albums
 A Steady Descent into the Soil (2015)
 Cast of Static and Smoke (2018)
 Glory, Glory! Apathy Took Helm! (2020)
 A Hymn of Loss and Hope (collaboration with Bismuth) (2022)

Singles
 Harbinger Of Nothing (Metal Swim 2 Compilation) (2019)
 In Tenebris Lux (with Bismuth) (2020)
 Paperdoll (Kittie cover, Send the Pain Below compilation) (2021)

EPs
 A Pessimistic Doomsayer (2016)

Compilations
 Preservation Rituals (2015-2018) (2019)

References

External links

Canadian doom metal musical groups
Canadian musical duos
Canadian LGBT musicians
LGBT-themed musical groups
Musical groups from Hamilton, Ontario